Peter Gawthorne (1 September 1884 – 17 March 1962) was an Anglo-Irish actor, probably best known for his roles in the films of Will Hay and other popular British comedians of the 1930s and 1940s. Gawthorne was one of Britain's most called-upon supporting actors during this period.

Early life and career
He was born in 1884 in Queen's County (now County Laois) in Ireland, but spent most of his career in England. After two years at the Academy of Dramatic Art, Gawthorne began a career on the London stage, eventually running up over twenty years experience there. His debut was in 1906, a walk-on part at His Majesty's Theatre, London. He was featured in the role of Albany Pope, receiving good notices, in the hit musical The Boy in 1917. He also studied singing.

He then toured Australia, South Africa and America, making his film debut in Hollywood before returning to Britain, where he worked for a number of film companies but predominately Gainsborough Studios.

He worked extensively in cinema often playing military officers and stern, authority figures, many of whom frequently clashed with the bumbling idiots played by Will Hay and other well-known comedians such as George Formby, The Crazy Gang, the Aldwych farceurs, Jack Hulbert, Cicely Courtneidge, Old Mother Riley, Tommy Trinder, Arthur Askey and Richard Murdoch.

His appearances were prolific and not just confined to comedies, taking in such films as The Iron Duke (1934), Goodbye, Mr. Chips (1939), "Pimpernel" Smith (1941), Love on the Dole (1941), and The Young Mr. Pitt (1942).

Filmography

Film

 Behind That Curtain (1929) as British Police Inspector
 His Glorious Night (1929) as General Ettingen
 One Hysterical Night (1929) as Mr. Bixby
 Sunnyside Up (1929) as  Lake the Butler
 Temple Tower (1930) as Matthews
 Those Three French Girls (1930) as Parker
 The Man Who Came Back (1931) as Griggs
 Charlie Chan Carries On (1931) as Inspector Duff
 I Like Your Nerve (1931) as Roberts - Lattimer's Butler 
 COD (1932) as Detective
 His Lordship (1932) as Ferguson, the Butler
 Jack's the Boy (1932) as Mr. Brown
 The Lodger (1932) as Lord Southcliff
 The Flag Lieutenant (1932) as Maj. Thesiger
 Perfect Understanding (1933) as Butler
 The Blarney Stone (1933) as Unknown role
 Prince of Arcadia (1933) as Equerry
 Leave It to Smith (1933) as Rolls
 The House of Trent (1933) as Lord Fairdown
 Grand Prix (1934) as John McIntyre
 Two Hearts in Waltz Time (1934) as Mr. Joseph
 Mr Stringfellow Says No (1934) as Prime Minister
 Something Always Happens (1934) as Mr. Hatch
 Girls, Please! (1934) as Van Hoffenheim
 Money Mad (1934) as Sir John Leyland
 The Camels are Coming (1934) as Colonel Fairley
 My Old Dutch (1934) as Mr. Paraday
 The Iron Duke (1934) as Duke of Richmond
 Dirty Work (1934) as Inspector Barlow
 Murder at Monte Carlo (1935) as Duprez
 Who's Your Father (1935) as Capt. Medway
 The Divine Spark (1935) as Felice Romani
 Man of the Moment (1935) as Staff Colonel
 Boys Will Be Boys (1935) as Minor Role 
 The Crouching Beast (1935) as Kadir Pasha
 Stormy Weather (1935) as Police Inspector
 Me and Marlborough (1935) as Mr. Barton
 Crime Unlimited (1935) as Newall
 No Limit (1935) as Mr. Higgins
 Wolf's Clothing (1936) as Sir Hector
 Pot Luck (1936) as Chief Constable
 A Woman Alone (1936) as President of Court Martial
 The Amazing Quest of Ernest Bliss (1936) as Sir James Alroyd
 The Man Behind the Mask (1936) as Lord Slade
 East Meets West (1936) as Stanton
 Everybody Dance (1936) as Sir Rowland Morton
 Windbag the Sailor (1936) as Minor Role 
 Good Morning, Boys (1937) as Col. Willougby-Gore
 Return of a Stranger (1937) as  Sir Herbert Tompkin
 Father Steps Out (1937) as Mr. Fitzwilliam
 Brief Ecstasy (1937) as Chairman of Steel Company
 Gangway (1937) as Assistant Commissioner Sir Brian Moore 
 Jericho (1937) as  Court Martial President 
 Under a Cloud (1937) as Sir Edmond Jessyl
 Smash and Grab (1937) as Insurance Company Chairman 
 The Last Adventurers (1937) as Fergus Arkell
 The Ticket of Leave Man (1937) as Joshua Gibson
 Easy Riches (1938) as  Stacey Lang
 Scruffy (1938) as Chairman
 Convict 99 (1938) as Sir Cyril
 Alf's Button Afloat (1938) as Capt. Driscol R.N.
 Hey! Hey! USA (1938) as Ship's Captain 
 Dead Men are Dangerous (1939) as Conray
 Inspector Hornleigh (1939) as Chancellor of the Exchequer 
 Sword of Honour (1939) as Lord Carhampton
 Home from Home (1939) as Governor
 Ask a Policeman (1939) as Chief Constable
 Goodbye, Mr. Chips (1939) as Army General 
 Secret Journey (1939) as Gen. von Reimer
 Flying Fifty-Five (1939) as Jonas Urquhart
 Riding High (1939) as Sir Joseph Wilmot
 What Would You Do, Chums? (1939) as Sir Douglas Gordon KC
 Where's That Fire? (1939) as Fire Chief
 Traitor Spy (1939) as Sir John
 They Came by Night (1940) as  Commissionaire 
 Laugh It Off (1940) as General
 Band Waggon (1940) as Claude Pilkington
 Crook's Tour (1940) as Minor Role 
 Three Silent Men (1940) as General Bullingdon
 Two for Danger (1940) as Assistant Commissioner
 Gasbags (1941) as Commanding Officer
 Love on the Dole (1941) as  Police Supt 
 Inspector Hornleigh Goes To It (1941) as Colonel
 Old Mother Riley's Ghosts (1941) as Mr. Cartwright
 "Pimpernel" Smith (1941) as Sidimir Koslowski
 Cottage to Let (1941) as Senior RAF Officer 
 I Thank You (1941) as Doctor Pope
 They Flew Alone (1942) as RAF Officer
 Let the People Sing (1942) as Maj. Shiptonthorpe
 The First of the Few (1942) as Board Member
 The Young Mr. Pitt (1942) as Admiral 
 Much Too Shy (1942) as Plaintiff's Counsel
 Women Aren't Angels (1943) as H.G. Colonel 
 We'll Meet Again (1943) as Theatre Manager
 Bell-Bottom George (1944) as Adm. Sir William Coltham
 The Hundred Pound Window (1944) as Van Rayden
 Murder in Reverse? (1945) as One of Crossley's Guests
 This Man Is Mine (1946) as Businessman
 Nothing Venture (1948) as Scotland Yard Official
 The Case of Charles Peace (1949) as Mr. Justice Lopes
 Kind Hearts and Coronets (1949) as First Lord Delivering Verdict 
 High Jinks in Society (1949) as Jenkins
 Soho Conspiracy (1950) as Father Shaney
 The Elusive Pimpernel (1950) as Chauvelin's Butler 
 Death Is a Number (1951) as James Gregson
 Salute the Toff (1952) as Mortimer Harvey
 Paul Temple Returns (1952) as Sir Graham Forbes
 Knights of the Round Table (1953) as Bishop 
 Five Days (1954) as Bowman 
 Tale of Three Women (1954) as Sir Frederick (segment "Thief of London' story)

TV series
Adventure Theater (1956, TV Series) - Sir Frederick (final appearance)

References

External links
 

Irish male film actors
1884 births
1962 deaths
People from County Laois
20th-century Irish male actors
British male comedy actors
20th-century British male actors